Eric Haydock (born Eric John Haddock; 3 February 1943 – 5 January 2019) was a British musician, best known as the original bass guitarist of The Hollies from December 1962 until July 1966. He was one of the first British musicians to play a Fender Bass VI, a six-string bass. Although considered a great bass guitarist, he was replaced in 1966 by Bernie Calvert, after disputes related to the conduct of the band's managers.

On 15 March 2010, Haydock along with Calvert and the other fellow Hollies members Allan Clarke, Graham Nash, Tony Hicks, Bobby Elliott, and Terry Sylvester were inducted into the Rock and Roll Hall of Fame.

Haydock died on 5 January 2019, at the age of 75.

Discography 

 Stay with The Hollies (1964)
 In The Hollies Style (1964)
 Hollies (1965)
 Would You Believe? (1966)
 For Certain Because (1966) (plays on one song only)

References

External links
Legends of the Sixties website

1943 births
2019 deaths
People from Burnley
English rock bass guitarists
Male bass guitarists
The Hollies members